The 1998–99 Arizona Wildcats men's basketball team represented the University of Arizona in the 1998–99 NCAA Division I men's basketball season. The head coach was Lute Olson. The team played its home games in the McKale Center in Tucson, Arizona, and was a member of the Pacific-10 Conference.  The Wildcats finished the season in second place in the Pacific-10 conference with a 13–5 record. Arizona reached the 1999 NCAA Division I men's basketball tournament, losing to Oklahoma in the first round and finishing the season with a 22–7 record.

Roster

Schedule and results 

|-
!colspan=9 style="background:#; color:white;"| Regular season

|-
!colspan=9 style="background:#;"| NCAA tournament

|-

Rankings

References 

Arizona Wildcats men's basketball seasons
Arizona Wildcats
Arizona
Arizona Wildcats
Arizona Wildcats